The Canton of Châteauneuf-sur-Cher is a former canton situated in the Cher département and in the Centre region of France. It was disbanded following the French canton reorganisation which came into effect in March 2015. It consisted of 11 communes, which joined the canton of Trouy in 2015. It had 4,602 inhabitants (2012).

Geography 
An area of forestry and farming by the banks of the Cher in the northwestern part of the arrondissement of Saint-Amand-Montrond, centred on the town of Châteauneuf-sur-Cher. The altitude varies from 128m at Corquoy to 226m at Vallenay, with an average altitude of 164m.

The canton comprised 11 communes:

Chambon
Châteauneuf-sur-Cher
Chavannes
Corquoy
Crézançay-sur-Cher
Saint-Loup-des-Chaumes
Saint-Symphorien
Serruelles
Uzay-le-Venon
Vallenay
Venesmes

Population

See also 
 Arrondissements of the Cher department
 Cantons of the Cher department
 Communes of the Cher department

References

Chateauneuf-sur-Cher
2015 disestablishments in France
States and territories disestablished in 2015